Rocking All Over the Years is a compilation album by English rock band Status Quo. The album contains all Quo's UK top 10 singles. Almost all songs have been shortened.

Track listing 
 "Pictures of Matchstick Men" (Rossi) from Picturesque Matchstickable Messages from the Status Quo 3.08
 "Ice in the Sun" (Wilde) from Picturesque Matchstickable Messages from the Status Quo 2.01
 "Paper Plane" (Rossi/Young) from Piledriver 2.53
 "Caroline" (Rossi/Young) from Hello! 3.40
 "Break the Rules" (Rossi/Young/Parfitt/Lancaster/Coghlan) from Quo 3.37
 "Down Down" (Rossi/Young) from On the Level 3.45
 "Roll Over Lay Down" (Rossi/Young/Parfitt/Lancaster/Coghlan) 4.41
 "Rain" (Parfitt) from Blue for You 4.25
 "Wild Side of Life" (Warren/Carter) Single release only 3.13
 "Rockin' All Over the World" (Fogerty) from Rockin' All Over the World 3.25
 "Whatever You Want" (Parfitt/Bown) from Whatever You Want 3.49
 "What You're Proposing" (Rossi/Frost) from Just Supposin' 3.50
 "Something 'Bout You Baby I Like" (Supa) from Never Too Late 2.38
 "Rock 'n' Roll" (Rossi/Frost) from Just Supposin' 3.50
 "Dear John" (Gustafson/MacCauley) from 1+9+8+2 3.12
 "Ol' Rag Blues" (Lancaster/Lamb) from Back to Back 2.48
 "Marguerita Time" (Rossi/Frost) from Back to Back 3.19
 "The Wanderer" (Maresca) Single release only 3.19
 "Rollin' Home" (David) from In the Army Now 3.58
 "In the Army Now" (Bolland/Bolland) from In the Army Now 3.39
 "Burning Bridges" (Rossi/Bown) from Ain't Complaining 3.51
 "Anniversary Waltz (Part One)" (Lee/Kind/Mack/Mendlesohn/Berry/Maresca/Bartholomew/King/Collins/Penniman/Hammer/Blackwell) Previously unreleased 5.00

Charts

Certifications

References

1990 compilation albums
Status Quo (band) compilation albums